The National Association of Football Managers (ANEF) is the association for football managers in Spain.

Organisation

Board of Directors
 President - Xavier Juliá
 First Vice President - Luis Aragonés
 Second Vice President - Víctor Fernández
 Third Vice President - Joaquín Caparrós

External links
Official website

2001 establishments in Spain
Association football trade unions
Trade unions established in 2001
Spanish football organisations
Trade unions in Spain
National